Grennan is an Irish surname. It may be of Norman origin, from the French name Grenan. Notable people with the surname include:

Eamon Grennan (born 1941), Irish poet
Justin Grennan (born 1978), American singer
Keith Grennan (born 1984), American football player
Mike Grennan (1950-2009), American curler
Tom Grennan (born 1995), English singer and songwriter 
Winston Grennan (1944–2000), Jamaican drummer
Jacqueline Grennan Wexler (1926–2012), American academic administrator

See also
Greenan (surname)
Julia Grenan (1884–1972), Irish nationalist and socialist in the Easter Rising
Grennan (disambiguation) 

English-language surnames
Surnames of Irish origin